Horst Rosenfeldt (born 8 December 1939) is a German diver. He competed in the men's 3 metre springboard event at the 1964 Summer Olympics.

References

1939 births
Living people
German male divers
Olympic divers of the United Team of Germany
Divers at the 1964 Summer Olympics
Divers from Berlin
20th-century German people